Cem Kaner is a professor of software engineering at Florida Institute of Technology, and the Director of Florida Tech's Center for Software Testing Education & Research (CSTER) since 2004.  He is perhaps best known outside academia as an advocate of software usability and software testing.

Prior to his professorship, Kaner worked in the software industry beginning in 1983 in Silicon Valley "as a tester, programmer, tech writer, software development manager, product development director, and independent software development consultant." In 1988, he and his co-authors Jack Falk and Hung Quoc Nguyen published what became, at the time, "the best selling book on software testing," Testing Computer Software.  He has also worked as a user interface designer.

In 2004 he cofounded the non-profit Association for Software Testing.

Education
Kaner received a Bachelor's Degree from Brock University in 1974, having focused on mathematics and philosophy.  He went on to receive a Ph.D. in experimental psychology from McMaster University in 1984, with a dissertation in the area of psychophysics (the measurement of perceptual experiences).  He later attended Golden Gate University Law School, with a primary interest in the law of software quality, graduating with a J.D. in 1994.

Consumer and Software Quality Advocacy
Kaner worked as a part-time volunteer for the Santa Clara, California Department of Consumer Affairs, investigating and mediating consumer complaints. In the 1990s, he got trial experience working as a full-time volunteer Deputy District Attorney, and later counselled independent consultants, technical book writers, and independent test labs on contract and intellectual property issues as an attorney.  He also did legislative work as a consumer protection advocate, including participation in the drafting of the Uniform Computer Information Transactions Act (as an advocate for customers and small software development firms), and the Uniform Electronic Transactions Act, and he participated in the United States Department of State's Advisory Committee on Private International Law: Study Group on Electronic Commerce. In 1999, he was elected to the American Law Institute, after being in practice for only five years.

This experience led him, in collaboration with David Pels, to publish Bad Software: What To Do When Software Fails in 1997.  This book was intended "to help people who had bought a defective computer program, with advice on troubleshooting their own problems, interacting with technical support, reporting problems to consumer protection agencies, bringing a lawsuit in small claims court, and if necessary, hiring a lawyer to bring a formal lawsuit."

Publications

Books

 (with coauthors Jack Falk and Hung Q. Nguyen)
 (with coauthor David L. Pels)
 (with coauthors Jack Falk and Hung Q. Nguyen) (Received the Award of Excellence from the Society for Technical Communication, Northern California Technical Publications Competition.)
 (with coauthors James Bach and Bret Pettichord and editor Margaret Eldridge)
 (with coauthors Sowmya Padmanabhan and Douglas Hoffman)
 (with coauthor Rebecca L. Fiedler)

Articles
 (with coauthor John R. Vokey)

References

External links
Official Cem Kaner homepage 
Official blog  "On the craft and community of software testing" 
Center for Software Testing Education & Research at Florida Tech
FIT Faculty Profile 

American bloggers
American computer programmers
American technology writers
Florida Institute of Technology faculty
Golden Gate University alumni
Golden Gate University School of Law alumni
Brock University alumni
California lawyers
Writers from Florida
Year of birth missing (living people)
Living people
Software testing people
21st-century American non-fiction writers